David Rice was the 15th Anglican Bishop of Waiapu. He was consecrated on 7 June 2008. An American, he was previously Dean of Dunedin.

Born in Lexington, North Carolina, he was educated at Lenoir-Rhyne University and Duke University. Initially a Methodist minister, he was received into the Anglican Church in 1998 and served at Mt Herbert parish before his appointment to the deanery. He resigned the bishopric in 2014 to stand for election as Provisional Bishop of the Episcopal Diocese of San Joaquin in California, where he now serves.

See also

 List of Episcopal bishops of the United States
 Historical list of the Episcopal bishops of the United States

References 

21st-century Anglican bishops in New Zealand
Anglican bishops of Waiapu
Deans of Dunedin
Duke University alumni
Episcopal bishops of San Joaquin
Lenoir–Rhyne University alumni
Living people
People from Lexington, North Carolina
Year of birth missing (living people)